Brooks Mill is an unincorporated community and census-designated place (CDP) in Blair County, Pennsylvania, United States. It was first listed as a CDP prior to the 2020 census.

The CDP is in southern Blair County, in the southern part of Blair Township. Pennsylvania Route 36 passes through the center of the community, leading south  to East Freedom and northeast  to Hollidaysburg.

Brooks Mill is on Halter Creek, just south of where it flows into the Frankstown Branch of the Juniata River. It is part of the Susquehanna River watershed.

Demographics

References 

Census-designated places in Blair County, Pennsylvania
Census-designated places in Pennsylvania